Dordaneh may refer to:
 Dordaneh, Eqlid
 Dordaneh, Kazerun